The 2012–13 season is Loyola's 4th season in the Philippines premier league, the UFL Division 1. The club do well last 2012 UFL Cup where they get the third place after defeating Green Archers United, 4–1. They reach the quarterfinals of 2012–13 PFF National Men's Club Championship after they lost to Kaya.

At the start of 2013 UFL season, Vincent Santos took over the coaching duties from Korean Kim Chul-so.

The club finished the 2013 season of the UFL Division 1 third behind Global FC and the champions, Stallion Sta. Lucia. They only reach the quarterfinal round of 2013 Singapore Cup when they bowed out to Tanjong Pagar United in a 5–4 aggregate.

Current squad

Competitions

Friendlies

Overview

UFL Division 1

League table

Matches

UFL Cup

PFF National Men's Club Championship

Singapore Cup

References 

United Football League
F.C. Meralco Manila seasons